Ma Yutao (born February 1936) is a Chinese opera singer and military general. Ma has been a longtime member of the People's Liberation Army, and she has represented the army in the National People's Congress. She holds the rank of lieutenant general.

Biography 
Ma Yutao was born in February 1936 in Baode, Shanxi. During her childhood, Ma was influenced by folk songs from Hequ. In 1950, at the age of fourteen, Ma enlisted in the People's Liberation Army as an actor, joining the  Art Troupe. In 1955, she was reassigned to the Beijing Military Region Art Troupe, where she began practicing solo choral music. Ma attended the Shanghai Institute of Vocal Music in the late 1950s, studying under . Lin introduced her to "vocal music, folk songs and operas" from various Chinese musicians, including Chang Xiangyu and Wang Kun, as well as the traditional operatic style Hebei bangzi. 

Ma is a soprano opera singer, with a timbre described as being "generous, bright, and mellow". As a singer for the PLA, Ma has performed at military and government events, for disaster relief programs, and in various symphonies. Ma has won several competitions and awards throughout her career, including placing first in a "national solo recital held by the Ministry of Culture". Ma has represented China in several international singing competitions, including those held in Vienna, Paris, and the Soviet Union; she was also a member of Zhou Enlai's entourage during his tour of Europe and Asia. In 1976, Ma performed in the musical  by Bayi Film Studio.

Since joining the Chinese Communist Party in 1956, Ma has served in some political offices. From 1975 until 1978, she represented the PLA in the National People's Congress, and at some point was also a member of the National Committee of the Chinese People's Political Consultative Conference.

Ma holds the rank of lieutenant general in the People's Liberation Army, the "highest rank in the entertainment industry in China". Ma is a member of the China Federation of Literary and Art Circles and the Chinese Musicians' Association, and was a co-founder of the Chinese Music Group, which toured in Australia and the United States. As of 2016, Ma is the art director of the PLA Comrades in Arms Song and Dance Troupe.

References 

Living people
1936 births
People from Shanxi
People's Liberation Army generals from Shanxi
Singers from Shanxi
Chinese Communist Party politicians from Shanxi
20th-century Chinese people
20th-century Chinese military personnel
21st-century Chinese military personnel
20th-century Chinese women opera singers
21st-century Chinese women opera singers
20th-century Chinese politicians
20th-century Chinese women politicians
Delegates to the National People's Congress from Shanxi
Delegates to the 4th National People's Congress
Members of the National Committee of the Chinese People's Political Consultative Conference
Members of the 8th Chinese People's Political Consultative Conference
Members of the 9th Chinese People's Political Consultative Conference
People's Republic of China politicians from Shanxi
Chinese opera actresses
Date of birth missing (living people)
Chinese operatic sopranos